The Malay Camp in Kimberley, South Africa, was a cosmopolitan suburb which was subject to forced removals prior to the Group Areas Act.


History 

Malay Camp had a history similar to Cape Town's District Six, Johannesburg's Sophiatown and Port Elizabeth's South End. It was a cosmopolitan suburb originating in the early days of Kimberley's existence but subject to forced slum clearance after the owner of the land (De Beers Consolidated Mines Ltd) donated the area to the Kimberley Municipality in 1939. Most of the houses, churches, mosques, shops and other buildings were demolished, making way for Kimberley's Civic Centre. This occurred from the 1940s, prior to the better known Apartheid forced removals consequent on the Group Areas Act, making Kimberley's Malay Camp clearance unique.

Prominent residents 

Solomon T. Plaatje, noted author, journalist and first General Secretary of the African Native National Congress, was a resident of Malay Camp. His later dwelling at 32 Angel Street is preserved as the Sol Plaatje Museum.

Malay Camp History Projects 
 Moosa Aysen's booklets on Islam on the Diamond Fields.
 Historical Society of Kimberley and the Northern Cape, 1998 - to collect social and living history.
 McGregor Museum Malay Camp Exhibition, 2002
 Louis Mallett Malay Camp Social History Project, 2003
 Liz Crossley Project The Past is not Dead, 2004
 Permanent display at the McGregor Museum, 2006,

References
Explanatory notes

Citations

Sources

External links 
 Liz Crossley: The Past is not Dead Project

Kimberley, Northern Cape